The 1984 Campeonato Paulista da Primeira Divisão de Futebol Profissional da Série A1 was the 83rd season of São Paulo's top professional football league. Santos won the championship for the 15th time. Noroeste and Marília  were relegated.

Championship
The twenty teams of the championship would all play twice against each other, with the team with the most points being champions, and the bottom two teams being relegated.

References

Campeonato Paulista seasons
Paulista